Paul Francis Cieurzo (November 1, 1907 – January 13, 1999) was an American football coach. He served as the head football coach at Rhode Island State College—now known as the University of Rhode Island—from 1942 to 1945, compiling a record of 5–4. Cieurzo died aged 91 in 1999.

Head coaching record

References

1907 births
1999 deaths
American men's basketball players
Rhode Island Rams football coaches
Rhode Island Rams football players
Rhode Island Rams men's basketball players
Rhode Island Rams men's track and field athletes
University of Rhode Island faculty
People from Fairhaven, Massachusetts
Players of American football from Massachusetts